The Satrapy of Armenia (Old Persian: 𐎠𐎼𐎷𐎡𐎴  or 𐎠𐎼𐎷𐎡𐎴𐎹 ), a region controlled by the Orontid dynasty (570–201 BC), was one of the satrapies of the Achaemenid Empire in the 6th century BC that later became an independent kingdom. Its capitals were Tushpa and later Erebuni.

History

Origins 

After the collapse of the Kingdom of Urartu (Ararat), the region was placed under the administration of the Median Empire and the Scythians. Later the territory was conquered by the Achaemenid Empire, which incorporated it as a satrapy, and thus named it the land of "Armina" (in Old Persian; "Harminuya" in Elamite; "Urashtu" in Babylonian).

Orontid Dynasty 

The Orontid Dynasty, or known by their native name, Eruandid or Yervanduni, was an Iranian hereditary dynasty that ruled the Armenian satrapy, the successor state to the Iron Age kingdom of Urartu (Ararat). It is suggested that it held dynastic familial linkages to the ruling Achaemenid dynasty. Throughout their existence, the Orontids stressed their lineage from the Achaemenids to strengthen their political legitimacy.

Members of the dynasty ruled Armenia intermittently during the period spanning from the 6th to at least the 2nd centuries BC, first as client kings or satraps of the Median and Achaemenid empires and later, after the collapse of the Achaemenid empire, as rulers of an independent kingdom, and later as kings of Sophene and Commagene, which eventually succumbed to the Roman Empire.

The Orontids established their supremacy over Armenia around the time of the Scythian and Median invasion in the 6th century BC. Its founder was Orontes I Sakavakyats (Armenian: Երվանդ Ա Սակավակյաց, Yervand I Sakavakyats). His son, Tigranes Orontid, united his forces with Cyrus the Great and killed Media's king. Moses of Chorene called him "the wisest, most powerful and bravest of Armenian kings."

From 553 BC to 521 BC, Armenia was a subject kingdom of the Achaemenid Empire, but when Darius I was king, he decided to conquer Armenia. He sent an Armenian named Dâdarši to stop a revolt against Persian rule, later replacing him with the Persian general, Vaumisa, who defeated the Armenians in 521 BC. Around the same time, another Armenian by the name of Arakha, son of Haldita, claimed to be the son of the last king of Babylon, Nabonidus, and renamed himself Nebuchadnezzar IV. His rebellion was short-lived and was suppressed by Intaphrenes, Darius' bow carrier.

Following the demise of the Achaemenid Empire, the Satrapy of Armenia was incorporated into Alexander's empire. After Alexander's death, the Orontids gained independence from 321 BC until 301 BC when the Kingdom of Armenia fell to the Seleucid Empire. In 212 BC, Xerxes, King of Armenia revolted against the Seleucids but capitulated when besieged at his capital, Arsamasota, by Antiochus III. In 201 BC, Armenia was conquered by Artashes, a general from the Seleucid Empire, and also said to be a member of Orontid dynasty. The last Orontid king Orontes IV was killed, but the Orontids continued to rule in Sophene and Commagene until the 1st century BC.

In two inscriptions of king Antiochus I of Commagene on his monument at Mount Nemrut, Orontes I (son of Artasouras and husband of Artaxerxes' daughter Rhodogoune), is reckoned as an ancestor of the Orontids ruling over Commagene, who traced back their family to Darius the Great.

Language 
Despite the Hellenistic invasion of Persia, Persian and local Armenian culture remained the strongest element within society and the elites.

The Orontid administration used Aramaic, where it was used in official documents for centuries. Whereas most inscriptions used Old Persian cuneiform. Xenophon used an interpreter to speak to Armenians, while some Armenian villages were conversant in Persian.

The Greek inscriptions at Armavir indicate that the upper classes used Greek as one of their languages. Under Orontes IV (r. ca. 210–200 B.C.), the structure of government had begun to resemble Greek institutions, and Greek was used as the language of the royal court. Orontes IV had surrounded himself by the Hellenized nobility and sponsored the establishment of a Greek school in Armavir, the capital of the Armenian kingdom.

See also 
Orontid dynasty
List of Armenian monarchs
Urartu
Achaemenid Empire
Kingdom of Armenia (antiquity)

Notes

References

Sources

 

Ancient Armenia
Achaemenid satrapies